Waunana is a genus of cellar spiders that was first described by B. A. Huber in 2000.

Species
 it contains four species, found only in Ecuador, Colombia, and Panama:
Waunana anchicaya Huber, 2000 – Colombia, Ecuador
Waunana eberhardi Huber, 2000 – Colombia
Waunana modesta (Banks, 1929) (type) – Panama
Waunana tulcan Huber, 2000 – Ecuador

See also
 List of Pholcidae species

References

Araneomorphae genera
Pholcidae
Spiders of Central America
Spiders of South America